Wind assisted propulsion is the practice of decreasing the fuel consumption of a merchant vessel through the use of sails or some other wind capture device.  Sails used to be the primary means of propelling ships, but with the advent of the steam engine and the diesel engine, sails came to be used for recreational sailing only. In recent years with increasing fuel costs and an increased focus on reducing emissions, there has been increased interest in harnessing the power of the wind to propel commercial ships.

A key barrier for the implementation of any decarbonisation technology and in particular of wind-assisted ones, is frequently discussed in the academia and the industry is the availability of capital. On the one hand, shipping lenders have been reducing their commitments overall while on the other hand, low-carbon newbuilds as well as retrofit projects entail higher-than-usual capital expenditure (CapEx). Therefore, research effort is directed towards the development of shared economy and leasing business models, where benefits from reduced consumption of fossil fuels as well as gains from carbon allowances or reduced levies are shared among users, technology providers and operators.

Design 
The mechanical means of converting the kinetic energy of the wind into thrust for a ship is the subject of much recent study.  Where early ships designed primarily for sailing were designed around the sails that propelled them, commercial ships are now designed largely around the cargo that they carry, requiring a large clear deck and minimal overhead rigging in order to facilitate cargo handling.  Another design consideration in designing a sail propulsion system for a commercial ship is that in order for it to be economically advantageous it cannot require a significantly larger crew to operate and it cannot compromise the stability of the ship.  Taking into account these design criteria, three main concepts have emerged as the leading designs for wind-assisted propulsion: the “Wing Sail Concept,” the “Kite Sail,” and the “Flettner Rotor.”

Wingsail
As a result of rising oil prices in the 1980s, the US government commissioned a study on the economic feasibility of using wind assisted propulsion to reduce the fuel consumption of ships in the US Merchant Marine. This study considered several designs and concluded that a wingsail would be the most effective. The wingsail option studied consisted of an automated system of large rectangular solid sails supported by cylindrical masts.  These would be symmetrical sails, which would allow a minimal amount of handling to maintain the sail orientation for different wind angles; however, this design was less efficient. A small freighter was outfitted with this system to evaluate its actual fuel gains, with the result that it was estimated to save between 15–25% of the vessel's fuel.

Kite sail
The kite sail concept has recently received a lot of interest. This rig consists of flying a gigantic kite from the bow of a ship using the traction developed by the kite to assist in pulling the ship through the water. Other concepts that have been explored were designed to have the kite rig alternately pull out and retract on a reel, driving a generator. The kite used in this setup is similar to the kites used by recreational kiteboarders, on a much larger scale.  This design also allows users to expand its scale by flying multiple kites in a stacked arrangement.

The idea of using kites was, in 2012, the most popular form of wind-assisted propulsion on commercial ships, largely due to the low cost of retrofitting the system to existing ships, with minimal interference with existing structures. This system also allows a large amount of automation, using computer controls to determine the ideal kite angle and position. Using a kite allows the capture of wind at greater altitudes, where wind speed is higher and more consistent. This system has seen use on several ships, with the most notable in 2009 being , a merchant ship chartered by the US Military Sealift Command to evaluate the claims of efficiency and the feasibility of fitting this system to other ships.

Flettner rotor

The third design considered is the Flettner rotor.  This is a large cylinder mounted upright on a ship's deck and mechanically spun.  The effect of this spinning area in contact with the wind flowing around it creates a thrust effect that is used to propel the ship.  Flettner Rotors were invented in the 1920s and have seen limited use since then.  In 2010 a 10,000 dwt cargo ship was equipped with four Flettner Rotors to evaluate their role in increasing fuel efficiency.  Since then, several cargo ships and a passenger ferry have been equipped with rotors.

The only parameter of the Flettner Rotor requiring control is the rotational speed of the rotor, meaning  this method of wind propulsion requires very little operator input. In comparison to kite sails, Flettner rotors often offer considerable efficiency gains when compared to the size of a sail or kite, versus the size of the rotor and prevailing wind conditions.

Examples of 2018 Flettner rotor installations include :

 Cruise ferry Viking Grace became the first passenger vessel with a rotor.
 The liquid bulk tanker Maersk Pelican in was retrofitted with two rotors.
 The ultramax bulk carrier Afros received four rotors, which can be moved aside during port operations.

Rising trends
The efficiency gains of these three propulsion assistance mechanisms are typically around 15–20% depending on the size of the system. The main reason for the use of these mechanisms not being more widespread is mostly the hesitancy of shipping companies to install untested equipment. With government initiatives to encourage a decrease in carbon emissions, and with rising fuel costs, it appeared probable that these propulsion systems would see more widespread use in the coming years.

Projects
 Smart Green Shipping Alliance
 Vindskip: A ship design using its hull as sail
 Wind Challenger Project
 Ventifoil
 Oceanbird
 Sailcargo

Organizations
 International Windship Association

See also
Viking Grace - rotor assisted cruise ship
Wind Surf wind assisted cruise ship

Hydrogen-powered ship
Nuclear marine propulsion
Internal drive propulsion
Integrated electric propulsion
Combined nuclear and steam propulsion
Astern propulsion
Marine propulsion
Air-independent propulsion

References

Marine propulsion
Wind